Bwana is a 1996 Spanish drama film directed by Imanol Uribe. The film was selected as the Spanish entry for the Best Foreign Language Film at the 69th Academy Awards, but was not accepted as a nominee. The plot tracks an African immigrant and a Spanish family treating the former as if he were an alien.

Cast
 Andrés Pajares as Antonio
 María Barranco as Dori
 Emilio Buale as Ombasi
 Alejandro Martínez as Iván
 Andrea Granero as Jessy
 Miguel del Arco as Román
 Paul Berrondo as Michael

See also
 List of submissions to the 69th Academy Awards for Best Foreign Language Film
 List of Spanish submissions for the Academy Award for Best Foreign Language Film

References

External links
 

1996 films
1996 drama films
Spanish comedy-drama films
1990s Spanish-language films
Films shot in Almería
Films about immigration to Spain
1990s Spanish films